Coles Child, usually known as Jeremy Child (1944–2022), was an English actor and baronet.

Coles Child may also refer to:

Sir Coles Child, 1st Baronet (1862–1929) of the Child baronets
Sir Coles John Child, 2nd Baronet (1906–1971) of the Child baronets
Sir Coles John Alexander Child, 4th Baronet (b. 1982) of the Child baronets

See also
Child (surname)